The 1947 Michigan State Normal Hurons football team represented Michigan State Normal College (later renamed Eastern Michigan University) during the 1947 college football season. In their 25th season under head coach Elton Rynearson, the Hurons compiled a 1–6 record and were outscored by their opponents, 106 to 29. After losing the first six games of the season, the Hurons defeated Ball State, 14–7, in the final game of the season. Charles H. Lane was the team captain. The team played its home games at Briggs Field on the school's campus in Ypsilanti, Michigan.

Schedule

References

Michigan State Normal
Eastern Michigan Eagles football seasons
Michigan State Normal Hurons football